Delusions of grandeur may refer to:

 Grandiose delusions
 Delusions of Grandeur (Fleming and John album)
 Delusions of Grandeur (novel)
 Delusions of Grandeur (Circle II Circle album), 2008
 Delusions of Grandeur (film), a 1971 French film
 Delusions of Grandeur (Sahg album), fourth studio album by the Norwegian band Sahg.
 Delusions of Grandeur (Gucci Mane album), fourteenth studio album by American rapper Gucci Mane.

See also 
 Grandeur (disambiguation)